Toledo Public Library may refer to:
 Toledo-Lucas County Public Library
 Toledo Public Library (Spain)